The Ireland men's national under-18 ice hockey team is the men's national under-18 ice hockey team of Ireland. The team is controlled by the Irish Ice Hockey Association, a member of the International Ice Hockey Federation. The team represents Ireland at the IIHF World U18 Championships.

International competitions

IIHF World U18 Championships

1999: 8th in European Division II (relegated)
2000: Lost in Qualification to European Division II (did not qualify)
2001–2008: Did not participate
2009: 3rd in Division III Group B
2010: 5th in Division III Group B
2011: 5th in Division III Group B
2012: Did not participate
2013: 4th in Division III Group B
2014–2017: Did not participate

External links
Ireland at IIHF.com

under-18
National under-18 ice hockey teams